Hendrik Adamson ( – 7 March 1946) was an Estonian poet and teacher.

He was born as a son of a tailor in Patsi farmstead in Metsakuru village, Kärstna Parish (now in Veisjärve village, Tarvastu Parish), Viljandi County. From 1911 he worked as a teacher at the Torma Võtikvere Ministry of education. From 1919 to 1927 he was the head of the primary school in Kärstna. Subsequently, he became a professional writer and a member of the Estonian Writers' Union.

Notable poems include  "Mulgimaa" (Tartu, 1919), "Inimen" (Tartu, 1925), "Tõus ja mõõn" (Tartu, 1931), "Kolletuspäev" (Tartu, 1934), "Mälestuste maja" (Tartu, 1936) and "Linnulaul" (Tartu, 1937). He also published the novels "Kuldblond neitsi" and "Roheline sisalik" (Tartu, 1925).

References

External links 
 Hendrik Adamson at Estonian Writers' Online Dictionary
 
 

1891 births
1946 deaths
People from Viljandi Parish
People from Kreis Fellin
Estonian male poets
Estonian Esperantists
20th-century Estonian poets
20th-century male writers